Žikica Vuksanović (born 11 May 1974) is a retired Slovenian football defender. He spent most of his career playing for Maribor in the Slovenian PrvaLiga.

Honours
Maribor
Slovenian Championship (4): 1997–98, 1998–99, 2001–02, 2002–03
Slovenian Cup (2): 1998–99, 2003–04

References

External links
NZS profile 
NK Maribor profile 

1974 births
Living people
Slovenian footballers
Association football defenders
NK Železničar Maribor players
NK Maribor players
FC Koper players
Slovenian PrvaLiga players
Slovenian expatriate footballers
Slovenian expatriate sportspeople in Austria
Expatriate footballers in Austria